You Only Live Once may refer to:

Film
 You Only Live Once (1937 film), an American crime drama film
 You Only Live Once (1952 film), a German comedy film 
 You Only Live Once (2017 film), an Argentine action film

Music
 Man lebt nur einmal! (You Only Live Once!), a waltz by Johann Strauss II
 "You Only Live Once" (song), by The Strokes, 2006
 "You Only Live Once", a song by Suicide Silence from their 2011 album The Black Crown
 "You Only Live Once", a song by Unsolved Mysteries from the album Tragic Trouble

Other
 You Only Live Once (book), a 2016 book written by Jason Vitug
 You Only Live Once (video game), a 2010 Flash game by Marcus Richter

See also
 YOLO (aphorism), an acronym for you only live once
 Yolo (disambiguation)
 You Only Live Twice (disambiguation)